Carodista montana is a moth in the family Lecithoceridae. It is found in Taiwan.

The wingspan is 16–18 mm. The forewings are covered with dark grey scales throughout. The inner discal spot is inconspicuously marked and the outer one is large and dark grey. The hindwings are grey.

References

Moths described in 1999
Carodista